Marvin Nunatak is a prominent nunatak  south of Depot Nunatak, rising to  on the west side of Cassidy Glacier, to the west of the Quartermain Mountains in Victoria Land, Antarctica. It was presumably first seen by the British National Antarctic Expedition, 1901–04, from nearby Depot Nunatak, and was named by the Advisory Committee on Antarctic Names in 1992 after Ursula B. Marvin of the Smithsonian Astrophysical Observatory, Cambridge, Massachusetts. Marvin was a field party member of the Antarctic Search for Meteorites expeditions to Victoria Land, 1978–79 and 1981–82, did field work at Seymour Island, 1984–85, and was a member of the Advisory Committee to the Division of Polar Programs, National Science Foundation, from 1983.

References

External links
 

Nunataks of Victoria Land
Scott Coast